At Mister Kelly's is a 1957 live album by American jazz singer Sarah Vaughan, recorded at Mister Kelly's jazz club in Chicago.

Reception 

The Allmusic review by John Bush awarded the album four-and-a-half stars and said that At Mister Kelly's captures Vaughan at her "best and most relaxed", stating that "her unerring sense of rhythm carries her through every song on this set, whether the occasion calls for playfulness and wit ("Thou Swell," "Honeysuckle Rose") or a world-wise melancholia ("Willow Weep for Me")". Bush also praises Jimmy Jones and Roy Haynes

Track listing 
 "September in the Rain" (Al Dubin, Harry Warren) – 3:30
 "Willow Weep for Me" (Ann Ronell) – 5:16
 "Just One of Those Things" (Cole Porter) – 3:18
 "Be Anything (But Be Mine)" (Irving Gordon) – 4:50
 "Thou Swell" (Lorenz Hart, Richard Rodgers) – 2:44
 "Stairway to the Stars" (Matty Malneck, Mitchell Parish, Frank Signorelli) – 5:06
 "Honeysuckle Rose" (Andy Razaf, Fats Waller) – 3:39
 "Just a Gigolo" (Julius Brammer, Irving Caesar, Leonello Casucci) – 4:10
 "How High the Moon" (Nancy Hamilton, Morgan Lewis) – 4:27
 "Dream" (Johnny Mercer) – 3:38
 "I'm Gonna Sit Right Down (And Write Myself a Letter)" (Fred E. Ahlert, Joe Young) – 2:30
 "It's Got to Be Love" (Rodgers and Hart) – 5:13
 "Alone" (Nacio Herb Brown, Arthur Freed) – 2:29
 "If This Isn't Love" (Yip Harburg, Burton Lane) – 2:25
 "Embraceable You" (George Gershwin, Ira Gershwin) – 2:47
 "Lucky in Love" (Lew Brown, Buddy DeSylva, Ray Henderson) – 2:10
 "Dancing in the Dark" (Howard Dietz, Arthur Schwartz) – 3:36
 "Poor Butterfly" (John Golden, Raymond Hubbell) – 4:45
 "Sometimes I'm Happy" (Irving Caesar, Vincent Youmans) – 2:00
 "I Cover the Waterfront" (Johnny Green, Edward Heyman) – 4:07

Personnel 
 Sarah Vaughan – vocals
 Jimmy Jones – piano
 Richard Davis – double bass
 Roy Haynes – drums

References 

Sarah Vaughan live albums
1957 live albums
Albums produced by Bob Shad
EmArcy Records live albums
Albums recorded at Mister Kelly's